This is a list of ambassadors of Canada to China.

Ambassadors to the Republic of China
Canada was originally represented in China by the British ambassador, who looked after the interests of the entire British Empire and later the British Commonwealth.  Canadian participation in World War II made it desirable to establish separate representation in China, and in 1942 a Canadian Embassy was opened in the temporary capital of Chongqing.  The embassy was then moved to the permanent Nationalist capital of Nanjing in 1946.

Ambassadors to the People's Republic of China

The Canadian ambassador remained in Nanjing after Communist troops took the city on April 23, 1949.  Canada then maintained diplomatic relations with Communist China at the chargé level from July 1949 to February 1951, when the Korean War made it impossible for diplomatic relations to continue.  Canada chose not to post an ambassador to the Nationalist capital of Taipei, maintaining relations through the Nationalist Chinese ambassador in Ottawa.

Canada recognized the People's Republic of China as the sole legitimate government of China on October 13, 1970, and a Canadian Embassy was opened in Beijing on June 10, 1971.

Ronning, Collins, Small and Menzies (born in Zhangde, Henan) were Chinese born diplomats who possessed significant Chinese cultural knowledge, and in the case of Ronning, near-native language skills. Paynter, Mulroney and Saint-Jacques had served as diplomats to China prior to being appointed ambassador.

John Lawrence Paynter died in Vancouver 10 months into his posting while still serving as Canada's Ambassador to China.

Embassy

The current embassy is located at 19 Dongzhimenwai Dajie in the Chaoyang District.

Official Address in English:
19 Dongzhimenwai Dajie,Chaoyang District,100600,People's Republic of China

Official Address in Simplified Chinese:
中国 北京市 100600
朝阳区
东直门外大街19号

See also

 Canadian Consulate-General, Hong Kong for list of High Commissioners and Consul General to Hong Kong and Macau
 Canadian Consulate-General, Guangzhou – located at TaiKoo Hui
 Canadian Consulate-General, Chongqing – located at Metropolitan Tower
 Canadian Consulate-General, Shanghai – located at ECO City Building

References 

China, People's Republic

Canada